Tromp was a Dutch fourth-rate ship of the line launched at Rotterdam in 1777. The Royal Navy captured her at the Capitulation of Saldanha Bay on 17 August 1796. The Royal Navy took her into service as HMS Tromp, sometimes referred to as HMS Van Tromp. In British service she served as a prison, troop, store, guard, hospital, or receiving ship until the Navy sold her in 1815.

Dutch service and capture

As of 1 January 1788, Tromp was lying at Helvoet.

The Royal Navy captured Tromp at Saldanha Bay on 17 August 1796. She was under the command of Lieutenant Jan Valkenburg, and was carrying 280 crew and passengers.

British service
The British commissioned Tromp in December 1796 under Captain Andrew Todd. Between 3 January and 19 April 1798, Tromp was at Portsmouth being fitted as a 24-gun troopship. Captain Richard Hill commissioned her in February.

On 1 January 1799, Tromp was off Ireland. On 16 January, Van Tromp arrived at Spithead with the transport ship Abbey. They were coming from Cork, Ireland, with 620 French prisoners. By 19 March, she was at Spithead, being fitted as a store ship. They were carrying the West York militia. Other warships, also armed en flute, were carrying the Oxford and the Cambridge militias.

In June Captain Richard Worsley took command of Tromp, but paid her off in December. In January 1800 the Admiralty ordered her to be fitted out as a prison ship for the West Indies. Between February and June she was at Chatham being fitted out. In April Commander Terence O'Neill commissioned her as a troopship.

On 17 July Tromp, and  left Portsmouth with a convoy to the West. Indies. At Port Royal Tromp took up her role as a prison ship. Her first commander was Lieutenant Felix Frankling (acting), and then in 1800 Lieutenant William Byam. Lieutenant John Fitzgerald replaced Byam and held command until 1802. Tromp returned to Britain in September and was paid off. Commander John A. Norway recommissioned Tromp in June 1803. She was fitted at Portsmouth as a guardship in August. She became a hospital ship at Falmouth in January 1806 under the command of Lieutenant Michael M'Carthy.

However, she may have reverted to the role of guardship under Norway's command. On 6 June 1806 a court martial dismissed Norway from the Navy. The ship's carpenter had accused Norway of converting the king's stores to his private purposes, and for making false musters. The court found the charge of converting not proven, but convicted Norway of the false musters.

Then on 28 August 1807, Tromp detained the Danish ships Diamond and Karen Louisa.

M'Carthy remained commander of Tromp though 1810. Then between April and May 1811 she was fitted as a receiving ship.

Fate
Tromp was in ordinary at Portsmouth between 1812 and 1814. The Navy sold her there for £700 on 9 August 1815.

Notes

Citations

References

 
Rotterdams jaarboekje (1900). Historisch Genootschap Roterodamum. (W. L. & J. Brusse).

Ships built in Rotterdam
1777 ships
Captured ships
Ships of the line of the Royal Navy
Hospital ships of the United Kingdom